La Bastide-du-Salat is a commune in the Ariège department in the Occitanie region of south-western France.

The inhabitants of the commune are known as Salatois or Salatoises.

Geography
La Bastide-du-Salat is located some 22 km east by south-east of Saint-Gaudens and 12 km north-west of Saint-Girons. The northern and western borders of the commune are also the departmental border with Haute-Garonne. Access to the commune is by the D134 road from Lacave in the south. The D134A continues north from the village becoming the D83H at the departmental border and on to Touille. The D60F goes west from the village across the Salat to Castagnède. The western third of the commune is farmland while the rest is heavily forested.

The Salat river forms the entire western border of the commune as it flows north to join the Garonne at Roquefort-sur-Garonne. The Ruisseau de la Monge rises in the far east of the commune and flows north-east to join the Lavin west of Betchat.

History

Founded in 1250 by Raymon-Athon, Lord of Prat, for two centuries it was called Bastida Raimondi-Athonis de Aspello.

La Bastide-du-Salat appears as la Baftide du Salat on the 1750 Cassini Map and la Basudo on the 1790 version.

Administration

List of Successive Mayors

Demography
In 2017 the commune had 182 inhabitants.

Culture and heritage

Religious heritage
The Parish Church of Notre-Dame-de-l'Assomption contains several items that are registered as historical objects:
6 Candlesticks (18th century)
A Ciborium (19th century)
A Statue: Christ on the Cross (16th century)
A Painting: Christ in the Tomb (1842)

Notable people linked to the commune
 André Cantenys, French filmmaker, born in La Bastide-du-Salat in 1920.

See also
Communes of the Ariège department
Couserans

References

Communes of Ariège (department)